Cathedral Dulce Nombre de Jesús or in English, Sweet Name of Jesus Cathedral, is a cathedral of the Catholic Church in Caguas, Puerto Rico. It is located on the Plaza Palmer in the center of town, and next to the Colegio Católico Notre Dame Elementary. There are only five cathedrals in Puerto Rico and Cathedral Dulce Nombre de Jesús is the seat of the Diocese of Caguas. The patron saint of the church, as well as that of the city, is the Dulce Nombre de Jesús (Sweet Name of Jesus).

History
The cathedral was constructed where the old ermita (hermitage or rural chapel) of San Sebastián del Barrero used to be located. San Sebastián del Barrero was the first Spanish settlement in the area that now comprises the City of Caguas. It is known that the chapel was built prior to 1645. Into the 18th century, the chapel was used for holding religious services. When the Municipality of Caguas was established by the Spanish Crown in 1775, the chapel was designated as its parish church and renamed.

The church was expanded at the end of the 19th century and remodeled in the 1920s. In 1930, part of the reconstruction of its current facade was started. This project was finished in the middle of the century. In 1936, the church was improved and remodeled again to its present form.

The church was raised to the status of cathedral when the Roman Catholic Diocese of Caguas was created by Pope Paul VI in 1964.

Tombs
The remains of Don Ximénez (died 1806), parish priest of the town, and of Rafael Grovas Félix (died 1991), the first Bishop of Caguas, are buried there. The remains of Carlos Manuel Rodríguez Santiago are also located in the cathedral. Rodríguez, better known locally as "el beato Charlie", spent his life in the surrounding neighborhood and is a candidate for canonization, the only layman from Puerto Rico to be so honored by the Catholic Church, and the first such American to beatified. His tomb reads: "We live for that night", referring to Easter, which was one of his favorite sayings.

Gallery

See also

 Catholic Church by country
 Catholic Church in the United States
 Ecclesiastical Province of San Juan de Puerto Rico
List of Catholic cathedrals in the United States
List of cathedrals in the United States
 Global organisation of the Catholic Church
 Roman Catholic Diocese of Caguas

References

External links
 Official Site
 Roman Catholic Diocese of Caguas (Official Site in Spanish)
 GCatholic page for Catedral Dulce Nombre de Jesús 
 Information about the Municipality of Caguas

Caguas, Puerto Rico
Dulce Nombre De Jesus
17th-century Roman Catholic church buildings
Roman Catholic churches completed in 1645